Aurora Picornell or Aurora Picornell Femenies (1 October 1912 – 5 January 1937) was a Spanish political martyr. She was a seamstress and a workers' activist known as "La Pasionaria mallorquina" ("La Pasionaria of Majorca"). She was a member of the Spanish Communist Party. In 1937, she was executed without trial by Francoist forces.

Life
Picornell was born in Palma, Majorca in the El Molinar district on October 1, 1912. She was a seamstress and political activist.

She is the sixth of seven brothers and sisters. She became politically active at a young age. At age 14 she left school to begin working as a seamstress. 

As a pre-adolescent she was a feminist and was involved in anti-clericalism against the Roman Catholic church.

In 1931, she organized the seamstresses' union in the Balearic Islands. Later she joined the Communist Party of Spain (PCE), in which she was one of the main leaders of their Balearic Federation. At 16 she published her first of many articles in the Communist newspaper Nuestra palabra ("Our Word").

She lived for some time in Valencia, where she married fellow communist .

In 1934, she helped establish the Communist Party on the island of Menorca. At the outbreak of the Spanish Civil War, Majorca fell into the hands of the Francoist rebels after a military coup. Picornell was the first woman arrested in the Casa del Poble ("House of the People", i.e. Party headquarters), and incarcerated in Mallorca's women's prison. Her colleagues tried to negotiate an exchange of prisoners, but before that was achieved she was taken by Falangists to the convent of Montuiri, where she was tortured.

She was murdered on 5 January 1937  at the cemetery in Porreres 30 km from Palma with other seamstresses: Catalina Flaquer Pascual, Antonia Pascual Flaquer, Maria Pascual Flaquer, and Belarmina Gonzalez Rodriguez. They are remembered in Majorca as Les Roges des Molinar ("The Reds of ").

Picornell's father, two brothers, and her husband all died during the civil war. 

At age 22 she gave birth to her only daughter, Octubrina Roja.

Legacy
Josep Articles Quetglas wrote, "Aurora Picornell, escrits 1930-1936". A school, IES Aurora Picornell, is named after her. A play based on her life has been written by Aina de Cos. The song 'Aurora' by the metal band Helevorn is about her.  She is also remembered in a Woman's Trail in Mallorca.

Books/Biographies 
Author: David Ginard i Féron
 Aurora Picornell (1912-1937). De la història, al símbol (2016). 
 Aurora Picornell. Feminismo, comunismo y memoria republicana en el siglo XX (2018).

References

1912 births
1937 deaths
People from Palma de Mallorca
Spanish women writers
Spanish communists
People executed by Francoist Spain
Extrajudicial killings